The Morris Sommer House, at 548 W. 2nd St. in Weiser, Idaho, was built in 1899.  It was listed on the National Register of Historic Places in 1982.

It is an L-shaped house which was designed by architect of the John E. Tourtellotte in a version of Queen Anne style. Aspects of the design consistent with Queen Anne style are the irregularity of its massing and roofline, use of a wraparound porch, and decorative elements in its surfaces and moldings.  It is unusual for its "long flared roof flowing down".  The "unusually flowing roof", coming from a high truncated hipped roof down and out over a porch, appears in later examples of the John E. Tourtellotte & Company's works.  Other examples are the Wills House in Boise, and the Wyman House (1908) on Harrison Boulevard also in Boise.

Notes

References

National Register of Historic Places in Washington County, Idaho
Queen Anne architecture in Idaho
Houses completed in 1899